David De Cremer is a Belgian scholar examining behavioral applications to organizations, management and economics. He has been appointed at the University of Cambridge (UK) as the KPMG chair in management studies at Judge Business School. He is also a visiting professor at London Business School (LBS) and China Europe International Business School (CEIBS). He is the founder of the Erasmus Behavioral Ethics Centre at the Rotterdam School of Management. Throughout his career he has lived and lectured in Europe, US, Middle-East and Asia.

Early life and education

De Cremer was born in Leuven, Belgium, and educated at the University of Leuven, where he obtained a master's degree in social psychology and a bachelor's degree in philosophy. He obtained his Ph.D. at the University of Southampton, UK. His Ph.D. focused on the psychological determinants of cooperation in economic decision-making games.

Honors
In  2011, he was awarded the ERIM (Erasmus Research Institute of Management; Rotterdam School of Management) “impact on managerial practices” award in the Netherlands for his book on When good people do bad things: On the psychology behind the financial crisis.

He is an associate editor of the journal Academy of Management Annals. He received the British Psychology Society award for “Outstanding Ph.D. thesis in social psychology”, the “Jos Jaspars Early Career award for outstanding contributions to social psychology”, the “Comenius European Young Psychologist award”, and the “International Society for Justice Research Early Career Contribution Award”. In 2005 he was elected as a member of the Young Academy of the Royal Dutch Academy of Sciences. In 2013 he was awarded the CEIBS Research Excellence Award (Shanghai, China).

Selected publications
 De Cremer, D., Van Dick, R., & Murnighan, J.K. (2010). On social animals and organizational beings: A social psychological approach to organizations. In De Cremer, D., Van Dick, R. & Murnighan, J.K. (Eds.), Social psychology and organizations (pp. 3–13). Taylor & Francis.
De Cremer, D., Zeelenberg, M., & Murnighan, J.K. (2006). Social animals and economic beings: On unifying social psychology and economics. In De Cremer, D., Zeelenberg, M.  & Murnighan, J.K. (Eds.), Social psychology and economics (pp. 3–14). Mahwah, New Jersey: Lawrence Erlbaum Association.
De Cremer, D., & Zhang, J. (2014). "Huawei to the future." Business Strategy Review, 25(1), 26-29.
De Cremer, D. (2011). "Restoring trust in financial institutions.: Financial Services Focus, 46 (February), 22-24.
De Cremer, D. (2012). "Leaders need a lesson in crisis management". Financial Times (February 7).

References

External links
De Cremer, David. Cambridge faculty page
De Cremer, David. LBS faculty page
Full list of David De Cremer's publications

Year of birth missing (living people)
Living people
Belgian psychologists
Old University of Leuven alumni